Mormodes buccinator is a species of orchid occurring from Chiapas to Brazil.

References

External links 

buccinator
Orchids of South America
Orchids of Central America
Orchids of Chiapas
Plants described in 1840